Ken and Deirdre's Bedtime Stories is an online spin off from the ITV soap opera Coronation Street. The episodes were announced in January 2011, being made available on the Coronation Street website from the 14th of February. The series featured the characters Ken Barlow and his wife Deirdre Barlow talking in bed before going to sleep.

Production
In January 2011, Coronation Street producers confirmed that Ken and Deirdre Barlow would take centre stage in a series of special webisodes. The online-only content would explore the discussions and banter which takes place in the couple's bedroom before the lights go out each night. The show's official website confirmed that ten webisodes have been commissioned and each would run for three minutes.

Revealing details of what is in store, a statement said: "With spilt tea on the sheets, flickering street lights from the cobbles and snoring habits high on the agenda, the night-time natter provides one last chance before the day ends for the bickering Barlows to discuss their differing approaches to life and living." The series started airing on the show's website on 14 February and ran for ten weeks thereafter. News of the internet spinoff followed the success of exclusive online-only content which was introduced for Coronation Street's 50th anniversary the month before.

Episodes
The series is made up of ten three-minute episodes.

References

External links
 
 

Coronation Street spin-offs